Live at the Royal Albert Hall is the fourth live album by the American rock band Alter Bridge. Recorded on October 2 and 3, 2017, at Royal Albert Hall in London, England, the band played two sold-out shows with the 52-piece Parallax Orchestra, conducted by Simon Dobson. For the occasion, the band performed songs that are rarely played, such as The End Is Here and Words Darker Than Their Wings, the latter receiving its live debut.

Background
The original idea of a doing a full concert with an orchestra was the brainchild of Tim Tournier, Alter Bridge's Manager. Tournier offered the idea after the band's promotional O2 Arena gig; the band members saw the idea as a "no-brainer" and began planning. Myles Kennedy explained, "I think out of all the years of doing this [music], this experience is the top two or three highlights without a doubt.". Three songs, Addicted To Pain, Words Darker Than Their Wings and The End Is Here, were released prior to the album.

Track listing

Personnel
Personnel adapted from the album liner notes
Alter Bridge
Myles Kennedy – lead vocals, rhythm guitar, lead guitar
Mark Tremonti – lead guitar, rhythm guitar, backing vocals, lead vocals
Brian Marshall – bass
Scott Phillips – drums

The Parallax Orchestra

Simon Dobson – Conductor, Music Director & Orchestral arrangements (Except where noted)
Andrew Skeet – Orchestral arrangements (In Loving Memory, Ghost of Days Gone By, The Last Hero, Words Darker Than Their Wings, Blackbird and Open Your Eyes)
Nathan Klein – Orchestral arrangements (In Loving Memory, Ghost of Days Gone By, The Last Hero, Words Darker Than Their Wings, Blackbird and Open Your Eyes)
James Toll – Violin 1.1
Lucy McKay – Violin 1.2
Glesni Roberts – Violin 1.3
Daniella Meagher – Violin 1.4
Elena Abad – Violin 1.5
Will Newell – Violin 1.6
Claire Sledd  Violin 2.1
Will Harvey – Violin 2.2 & Orchestral arrangements (The End Is Here, Waters Rising and Lover)
Aura Fazio – Violin 2.3
Olivia Holland – Violin 2.4
Sophie Belinfante – Violin 2.5
Katherine Sung – Violin 2.6
Anisa Arslanagic – Viola 1
Elitsa Bogdanova – Viola 2
Jenny Ames – Viola 3
Sophia Rees – Viola 4
Raisa Zapryanova – Viola 5
Zami Jalil – Viola 6
Maddie Cutter – Cello 1
Bethan Lloyd – Cello 2
Fraser Bowles – Cello 3
David Kadumukasa – Cello 4
Alex Marshall – Cello 5
Klara Schumann – Cello 6
Alex Verster – Double bass 1
Jess Ryan – Double bass 2
Sam Kinrade – Trumpet
Sarah Campbell – Trumpet
Ross Anderson – Trombone & Bass Trombone
Jane Salmon – Trombone & Bass Trombone
Tom Kelly – Tuba
Tom Bettley – French Horn 1
Sam Pearce – French Horn 2
Laurie Truluck – French Horn 3
Beth Higham-Edwards – Percussion 1/Timpani
Molly Lopresti – Percussion 2/Tuned percussion
Alex Griffiths – Flute & Piccolo
Eleanor Tinlin – Oboe
Dan Hillman – Clarinet & Baritone saxophone
Tom Moss – Bassoon & Contrabassoon
Lewis Reid – Double Bass (27th rehearsal only)
Eloise MacDonald – Violin 1 (27th rehearsal only)

Production
Dan Sturgess – Director & Editor
Sturge Media – Film producer
Tim Tournier – Executive producer
Ben Gazey – Associate producer
Brian Sperber – Music producer
Tim Roe – Recording engineer
Brad Blackwood – mastering

Charts

References

2018 live albums
Alter Bridge albums
Napalm Records live albums